Iltja Ntjarra Many Hands Art Centre, or Many Hands Art Centre, is an Aboriginal owned and directed art centre based in Alice Springs and it is home to, and has a special focus on supporting, the Hermannsburg School; the best known artist of which was Albert Namatjira. It was established in 2004 by the Ngurratjuta/Pmara Ntjarra Aboriginal Coprporation as a place for Arrernte artists to come together to "paint, share and learn new techniques". The centre is also strongly committed to improving the economic participation of its artists, ethical work practices and returning the greatest possible percentage of sales to the artist.

History 

Albert Namatjira was one of the first famous Aboriginal artists and, having learned watercolour techniques from Rex Battarbee, he held his first exhibition in 1938 and had become a household name in Australia by the 1960s and is arguably one of the most famous artists of the 20th century. Namatjira taught his children, and other relatives, to paint in his unique style and these skills continue to be passed on and continue to receive international acclaim. By continuing the legacy of Namatjira the Iltja Ntjarra artists sustain an important piece of living history.

Artists 
Many hands artists include:

 Aaron Kingsley
 Benita Clement
 Betty Namatjira Wheeler Naparula
 Clare Inkamala
 Dellina Inkamala
 Doris Inkamala
 Georgie Kentiltja
 Gloria Pannka
 Gwenda Namatjira Nungarayi
 Hilary Wirri
 Hergert Pareroultja
 Ivy Pareroultja
 Janie Karpa
 Jeffrey Waku
 Johannes Katakarinja
 Kathleen France
 Kathy Inkamala
 Kevin Namatjira
 Lenie Namatkira
 Marcus Wheeler
 Marie Abbott / Ramjohn
 Mervyn Rubuntja
 Narina Meneri
 Noreen Hudson
 Peter Tjutjatja
 Reinhold Inkamala
 Ricky Connick Jakamara
 Selma Coulthard Nunay
 Sophia Inkamala
 Stanley Ebatarinja
 Steven Walbungara
 Therese Ryder
 Vanessa Inkamala
 Wilfred Kentilja

See also
Namatjira Project

External links 

 Iltja Ntjarra Many Hands Art Centre; https://manyhandsart.com.au/

References 

Australian Aboriginal artists
Culture of the Northern Territory